"Loco" ("crazy") is a song by American singer Justin Quiles, Dominican rapper Chimbala and Puerto Rican  duo Zion & Lennox. It was released on May 13, 2021 via Warner Music Latina. The song was from Quiles's third studio album La Última Promesa.

Critical reception
Staffs of Billboard commented that the track "giv[es] life to those Caribbean flares", writing that it makes "it a refreshing, tropical song that can easily become a summer anthem".

Music video
The music video was directed and produced by Rodrigo Films. The video was filmed in the Dominican Republic.

Charts

Weekly charts

Year-end charts

Certifications

Release history

See also
List of Billboard number-one Latin songs of 2021

References

2021 songs
2021 singles
Justin Quiles songs
Zion & Lennox songs
Spanish-language songs
Songs written by Justin Quiles